is a Japanese actress.

Career
Suzuki began acting after high school and debuted at age 19 in the television drama Asobi Ja Nai No Yo, Kono Koi Wa (TBS, 1986). 

Her breakthrough came in 1991 with the role of Rika in the Fuji TV television adaptation of Fumi Saimon's manga Tokyo Love Story. The scholar Alisa Freedman has said that "Tokyo Love Story grabbed media and viewer attention because of the main character Rika", and the show made Suzuki famous at home and in Asia. 

She married the comedian Takaaki Ishibashi in 1998, and dropped out of show business in 1999 after giving birth to a daughter. She resumed her acting career with the NHK Taiga drama Gō (2011).

Selected filmography

Television

Films

Awards

References

External links
 

People from Tokyo
1966 births
Living people
Actresses from Tokyo